Club Lleida Esportiu is a Spanish football team based in Lleida, in the autonomous community of Catalonia. Founded in July 2011 it plays in Segunda División RFEF – Group 3, holding home games at Camp d'Esports, with a capacity of 13,500 seats.

History
In mid-May 2011, historic club UE Lleida was liquidated due to a €27.2 million debt. Its berth was auctioned and acquired by an entrepreneur from Lleida, Sisco Pujol, who created the new Lleida Esportiu, which started competing in Segunda División B; the club was also scheduled to take part in the 2011–12 Copa del Rey, in place of Unió Esportiva.

Esportiu played its first friendly game on 6 August 2011, with CF Pobla de Mafumet (2–0). On the 21st, the team played its first official match, losing 1–3 against CF Reus Deportiu.

In 2013, just in their second season, Lleida Esportiu played for the first time the promotion playoffs to Segunda División. In 2016, their third try in four years, the team lost promotion in the last round against Sevilla Atlético, after a penalty shootout.

One year later, Lleida Esportiu reached for the first time the round of 16 of the Copa del Rey, after eliminating top-level side Real Sociedad, by overcoming a disadvantage of three goals in the aggregate score, in the previous round. In their first appearance in the round of 16, the club was eliminated by Atlético Madrid.

The club finished 2018–19 season in the 6th place in the Group 3 of Segunda División B.

Season to season

10 seasons in Segunda División B
1 season in Segunda División RFEF

Detailed list of seasons

Players

Current squad

Reserves

Out on loan

Records
Record league victory: 0–6 vs. Atlético Baleares (3 April 2016)
Record league defeat: 5–1 vs. Villarreal B (3 October 2015), 4–0 vs. Sabadell (21 December 2019)
Record attendance: 13,700 vs. Sevilla Atlético, Segunda División B Play-off (19 June 2016)
Most league appearances: 193, Pau Torres (2012–2015, 2018–)
Most league goals scored: 29, Jaime Mata (2012–14)
Most goals scored, season: 19, Pedro Martín (2018–19)
Highest league position: 3rd in Segunda División B (2014)
Copa del Rey best: Round of 16 (2017–18)
Record consecutive league appearances: 88, Pau Torres (August 2012 – November 2014)
Youngest player: Òscar Canadell, 17 years and 158 days (against Ontinyent, 6 April 2014)
Oldest player: Óscar Rubio, 38 years and 308 days (against Olot, 19 March 2023)

Coaches

''Statistics are correct as of 19 March 2023.

Notable players
Note: this list includes players playing on fully professional top leagues or with international caps.

Notes

References

External links
Official website 
BDFútbol profile
Futbolme team profile 

 
Association football clubs established in 2011
Football clubs in Catalonia
2011 establishments in Spain
Sport in Lleida